Janette Rose Tinetti (born 1968) is a New Zealand politician and a Member of Parliament in the House of Representatives for the Labour Party.

Personal life
Tinetti was born in Hokitika on the West Coast of the South Island, the youngest of six children. When she was 11 months old, her family moved to Templeton, just outside Christchurch, when her father Peter Tinetti became secretary of Templeton Hospital and Training School, a institution for people with intellectual disabilities. The family lived in the only staff house, in the middle of the institution, which is where Tinetti grew up. She received her secondary school education at Villa Maria College in Christchurch. She then studied at the Christchurch College of Education, from where she obtained a diploma in teaching in 1990. She became a primary school teacher and union member, teaching in Southland, Greymouth and Tauranga, and spent 20 years as a primary school principal. She graduated from the University of Canterbury with a Postgraduate Diploma in Education in 2013 and a Master of Education in 2016.  She was the principal of Merivale School in Tauranga and has been on the national executive of the New Zealand Educational Institute. She is married to David Merton, whose father Don Merton was a noted conservationist, and the couple have two children. In 2019, she was diagnosed with breast cancer, for which she had surgery, but did not need chemotherapy or radiation treatment.

Political career

She entered parliament via the party list, after coming second in the electorate vote, with the incumbent—the National Party's Simon Bridges—winning with a 11,252-vote margin.

She contested Tauranga again in the 2020 general election and was 32nd on the 2020 Labour party list. She was elected from the party list, after coming second to Bridges in the electorate vote by a margin of 1,856 votes.

Tinetti put her name forward for the Labour candidacy in the 2022 Tauranga by-election, after Bridges resigned from parliament, and was confirmed as the candidate on 6 April. She came second to the National Party candidate Sam Uffindell.

Cabinet positions
In the Cabinet formed after the 2020 election, Tinetti was appointed Minister of Internal Affairs, Minister for Women and Associate Minister of Education.

In a cabinet reshuffle by new Prime Minister Chris Hipkins on 31 January 2023, Tinetti was promoted to the number six position in Cabinet, becoming the Minister of Education and Minister for Child Poverty Reduction, while retaining her role as Minister for Women.

References

External links
 

|-

|-

Living people
People from Hokitika
People educated at Villa Maria College, Christchurch
New Zealand Labour Party MPs
Members of the New Zealand House of Representatives
21st-century New Zealand women politicians
New Zealand list MPs
Women members of the New Zealand House of Representatives
Candidates in the 2017 New Zealand general election
New Zealand schoolteachers
1968 births
Candidates in the 2020 New Zealand general election
Christchurch College of Education alumni
Female interior ministers
Members of the Cabinet of New Zealand
Women government ministers of New Zealand